The 1883 Victorian Football Association season was the seventh season of the Australian rules football competition. The premiership was won by the Geelong Football Club. It was the club's fifth VFA premiership in just six seasons, and was the second in a sequence of three consecutive premierships won from 1882 to 1884.

Association membership 

At this time, three other provincial senior clubs were full Association members represented on the Board of Management, for a total membership of nine: Ballarat, Albion Imperial and Horsham Unions. Due to distance, these clubs played too few matches against the rest of the VFA to be considered relevant in the premiership.

1883 VFA premiership 
The 1883 premiership was won by the Geelong Football Club, captained by Chas Brownlow of Brownlow Medal fame. Geelong won fifteen and drew three of its twenty-one matches for the season. It was named premiers ahead of runners-up , whose record of eighteen wins and three draws from twenty-five matches was almost equally meritorious.  finished third.

Club senior records 
The below table details the playing records of the six clubs in all matches during the 1883 season. Two sets of results are given:
 Senior results: based only upon games played against other VFA senior clubs
 Total results: including senior games, and games against intercolonial, up-country and junior clubs.

The clubs are listed in the order in which they were ranked in the Sportsman newspaper. The VFA had no formal process by which the clubs were ranked, so the below order should be considered indicative only, particularly since the fixturing of matches was not standardised; however, the top three placings were later acknowledged in publications including the Football Record and are considered official.

External links 
 Victorian Football Association/Victorian Football League History (1877-2008)
 List of VFA/VFL Premiers (1877-2007)
 History of Australian rules football in Victoria (1853-1900)

References 

Victorian Football League seasons
Vfa Season, 1883